In Full Swing may also refer to:

In Full Swing (Mark O'Connor album), 2003
In Full Swing (Seth MacFarlane album), 2017
In Full Swing, album by Czech band Malignant Tumour
"In Full Swing", 1993 single B-side by Ronny Jordan